A bandbox is a type of theatre or stage. Bandbox, band box or band-box may also refer to:

Arts
 "Story of the Bandbox", a story by Robert Louis Stevenson
Bandbox, a 1912 novel by Louis Joseph Vance
Bandbox: A Novel, a 2004 novel by Thomas Mallon
Bandbox, a type of automaton jukebox made by Chicago Coin Co.

Places
Band Box (music club), next to Birdland (New York jazz club) on 52nd Street in New York City
The Band Box, an outdoor restaurant in Nashville, Tennessee
Band Box Diner, Minneapolis, Minnesota
Bandbox Theatre, formerly Adolf Philipp's playhouse, on East 57th Street, New York City
Baker Bowl, a baseball field nicknamed The Band Box

Other uses
A graphical user interface interaction technique that involves drawing a box around objects to select them
A cylindrical box for holding pieces of fabric for dressmaking or needlework
A baseball park with relatively small field dimensions
Bandbox Plot, a 1712 attempt on the life of Robert Harley, Earl of Oxford
Control and Reporting Centre at the Air Operations Control Station Nieuw-Milligen, Netherlands (aviation call sign "bandbox")